Dehenglong Township (Mandarin: 德恒隆乡) is a township in Hualong Hui Autonomous County, Haidong, Qinghai, China. In 2010, Dehenglong Township had a total population of 9,699: 4,938 males and 4,761 females: 2,923 aged under 14, 6,193 aged between 15 and 65 and 583 aged over 65.

References 

Township-level divisions of Qinghai
Haidong